Jonathan Strahan (born 1964, Belfast, Northern Ireland) is an editor and publisher of science fiction, fantasy, and horror. His family moved to Perth, Western Australia in 1968, and he graduated from the University of Western Australia with a Bachelor of Arts in 1986.

In 1990 he co-founded Eidolon: The Journal of Australian Science Fiction and Fantasy, and worked on it as co-editor and co-publisher until 1999. He was also co-publisher of Eidolon Books which published Robin Pen's The Secret Life of Rubber-Suit Monsters, Howard Waldrop's Going Home Again, Storm Constantine's The Thorn Boy, and Terry Dowling's Blackwater Days.

In 1997 Jonathan worked in Oakland, California for Locus: The Newspaper of the Science Fiction Field as an assistant editor and wrote a regular reviewer column for the magazine until March 1998 when he returned to Australia. In early 1999 Jonathan resumed reviewing and copyediting for Locus, and was then promoted to Reviews Editor (January 2002 – present). Other reviews have appeared in Eidolon, Eidolon: SF Online, and Foundation. Jonathan has won the Aurealis Award, the William Atheling Jr Award for Criticism and Review, the Australian National Science Fiction Convention's "Ditmar Award", and the Peter McNamara Achievement Award.

A nineteen-time Hugo Award nominee, Strahan won the World Fantasy Award (Special – Professional) in 2010 for his work as an editor, and his anthologies have won the Locus Award for Best Anthology four times (2008, 2010, 2013, 2021) and the Aurealis Award seven times.

As a freelance editor, Strahan has edited or co-edited more than sixty original and reprint anthologies and seventeen single-author story collections that have been published in Australia, the United Kingdom, and the United States, and translated into many languages. He has been a consulting editor for Tordotcom Publishing and Tor.com since 2014, where he has acquired and edited two novels, 36 novellas, and a selection of short fiction.

In 1999, Strahan founded The Coode Street Press, which published the one-shot review 'zine The Coode Street Review of Science Fiction and co-published Terry Dowling's Antique Futures. The Coode Street Press is currently inactive.

Strahan currently co-hosts the regular Coode Street Podcast with Gary K. Wolfe, which won the Hugo Award in 2021, and has been nominated for the World Fantasy, British Science Fiction, and Ditmar awards and which has produced more than 550 episodes since May 2010.

Jonathan married former Locus Managing Editor Marianne Jablon in 1999 and they live in Perth, Western Australia with their two daughters.

Edited works 
The Year's Best Australian Science Fiction and Fantasy Volume: 1, (with Jeremy G Byrne), HarperCollins Publishers Australia, Sydney 1997, tpb
The Year's Best Australian Science Fiction and Fantasy Volume: 2, (with Jeremy G Byrne), HarperCollins Publishers Australia, Sydney 1998, pb
Science Fiction: Best of 2003, (with Karen Haber), ibooks, New York 2004, pb
The Locus Awards: Thirty Years of the Best in Fantasy and Science Fiction, (with Charles N. Brown), HarperCollins Publishers Australia, Sydney 2004, tpb
Best Short Novels: 2004, Bookspan Inc/The Science Fiction Book Club, New York, 2004, hc
Science Fiction: Best of 2004,  (with Karen Haber), ibooks, New York 2005, pb
Fantasy: Best of 2004,  (with Karen Haber), ibooks, New York 2005, pb
Best Short Novels: 2005, Bookspan Inc/The Science Fiction Book Club, New York, 2005, hc
Best Short Novels: 2006, Bookspan Inc/The Science Fiction Book Club, New York, June 2006, hc
Science Fiction: The Very Best of 2005, The Locus Press, Oakland, California,. September 2006
Fantasy: The Very Best of 2005, The Locus Press, Oakland, California, September 2006
Eidolon 1, (with Jeremy G Byrne), Eidolon Books, Perth August 2006, tpb
The Jack Vance Treasury, (with Terry Dowling), Subterranean Press, January 2007, hc
The Best Science Fiction and Fantasy of the Year: Volume 1, Night Shade Books, March 2007, tpb
Best Short Novels: 2007, Bookspan Inc/The Science Fiction Book Club, New York, May 2007, hc
The New Space Opera, (with Gardner Dozois), HarperCollins Publishers, New York June 2007; HarperCollins Publishers Australia, Sydney June 2007, tp
Ascendancies: The Best of Bruce Sterling, Bruce Sterling, Subterranean Press, Summer 2007, hc
Eclipse One: New Science Fiction and Fantasy, Night Shade Books, October 2007, tpb
The Best Science Fiction and Fantasy of the Year: Volume 2, Night Shade Books, March 2008, tpb
The Starry Rift: Tales of New Tomorrows, Viking Penguin, New York, Spring 2008, hc
The Jack Vance Reader, Jack Vance (with Terry Dowling), Subterranean Press, Summer 2008, hc
Eclipse Two: New Science Fiction and Fantasy, (Night Shade Books, October 2008, tpb)
Wild Thyme, Green Magic: Stories by Jack Vance, Jack Vance (with Terry Dowling) (Subterranean Press, Summer 2009, hc)
The Best Science Fiction and Fantasy of the Year: Volume 3, (Night Shade Books, June 2009, tp)
The New Space Opera 2 (with Gardner Dozois) (HarperCollins Publishers, New York July 2009, tp)
Eclipse Three: New Science Fiction and Fantasy, (Night Shade Books, October 2009, tp)
The Best Science Fiction and Fantasy of the Year: Volume 4 (Night Shade Books, March 2010)
Mirror Kingdoms: The Best of Peter S. Beagle (Subterranean Press, March 2010)
Fritz Leiber: Selected Stories (ed. with Charles N. Brown) (Night Shade Books, April 2010)
The Green Leopard Plague and Other Stories, Walter Jon Williams (Night Shade Books, April 2010)
Subterranean Online, Spring Issue (April 2010)
Hard Luck Diggings: The Early Jack Vance (ed. with Terry Dowling) (Subterranean Press, June 2010)
Legends of Australian Fantasy (ed. with Jack Dann) (HarperCollins Publishers Australia, July 2010)
Wings of Fire (ed. with Marianne S. Jablon) (Night Shade Books, May 2010)
Swords and Dark Magic: The New Sword and Sorcery (ed. with Lou Anders) (Harper Eos, July 2010)
The Best of Kim Stanley Robinson (Night Shade Books, August 2010)
Godlike Machines (The Science Fiction Book Club, September 2010)
The Best of Larry Niven (Subterranean Press, December 2010)
Engineering Infinity (Solaris, December 2010)
The Best Science Fiction and Fantasy of the Year: Volume 5 (Night Shade Books, February 2011)
Life on Mars: Tales from the New Frontier (Viking Books for Young Readers, April 2011)
Eclipse Four: New Science Fiction and Fantasy, ( Night Shade Books, May 2011)
Dangerous Ways: Mystery Novels, Jack Vance (with Terry Dowling) (Subterranean, June 2011)
The Best Science Fiction and Fantasy of the Year: Volume 6 (Night Shade Books, March 2012)
Dream Castles: The Early Jack Vance Volume 2, Jack Vance (with Terry Dowling) (Subterranean, June 2012)
Under My Hat: Tales from the Cauldron (Random House Books for Young Readers, August 2012)
Desperate Days: Selected Mysteries Volume 2, Jack Vance (with Terry Dowling (Subterranean, October 2012)
Edge of Infinity (Solaris, December 2012)
The Best of Joe Haldeman, Jonathan Strahan & Gary K. Wolfe eds. (Subterranean, March 2013)
Magic Highways: The Early Jack Vance Vol 3, Jack Vance (with Terry Dowling)  (Subterranean, March 2013)
The Best Science Fiction and Fantasy of the Year: Volume 7 (Night Shade Books, March 2013) 
Fearsome Journeys – The New Solaris Book of Fantasy (Solaris, May 2013) 
Subterranean Online January 2014
The Best Science Fiction and Fantasy of the Year: Volume 8 (Solaris, May 2014)
Reach for Infinity (Solaris, June 2014)
Fearsome Magics: The New Solaris Book of Fantasy (Solaris, October 2014)
Grand Crusades The Early Jack Vance Volume 5, Jack Vance (with Terry Dowling) (Subterranean Press, 2015)
The Best Science Fiction and Fantasy of the Year: Volume 9 (Solaris Books, May 2015)
Meeting Infinity, Jonathan Strahan (Solaris, December 2015)
The Best Science Fiction and Fantasy of the Year: Volume 10 (Solaris Books, April 2016)
Drowned Worlds (Solaris, July 2016)
Beyond the Aquila Rift: The Best of Alastair Reynolds, William Schafer & Jonathan Strahan eds. (Subterranean Press, July 2016)
Bridging Infinity, Jonathan Strahan (Solaris, October 2016)
The Best Science Fiction and Fantasy of the Year: Volume 11 (Solaris Books, April 2017)
The Best Science Fiction and Fantasy of the Year: Volume 12 (Solaris Books, March 2018)
Infinity's End, Jonathan Strahan (Solaris, July 2018)
Mission: Critical (Solaris Books, July 2019)
The Best of R.A. Lafferty (Gollancz 2019, Tor Essentials 2021)
The Best Science Fiction and Fantasy of the Year: Volume 13 (Solaris, April 2019)
Made to Order: Robots and Revolution (Solaris, March 2020)
The Book of Dragons (Harper Voyager Books, July 2020)
The Year's Best Science Fiction: The Saga Anthology of SF 2021 (Saga Press, September 2020)
The Year's Best Science Fiction: The Saga Anthology of SF 2022 (Saga Press, September 2021)
Someone in Time: Tales of Time-Crossed Romance (Solaris, April 2022, tp)
Tomorrow's Parties: Living in the Anthropocene (MIT Press, July 2022, tp)
The Book of Witches (Harper Voyager, hc, 2023)
The Last Witness, K. J. Parker, Tor.com, October 2015
The Devil You Know, K. J. Parker, Tor.com, March 2016
The Dream Quest of Vellitt Boe, Kij Johnson, Tor.com, August 2016
Impersonations, Walter Jon Williams, Tor.com, 2016
Passing Strange, Ellen Klages, Tor.com, January 2017
Agents of Dreamland, Caitlin R. Kiernan, Tor.com, February 2017
Proof of Concept, Gwyneth Jones, Tor.com, April 2017
Time Was, Ian McDonald, Tor.com Publishing, April 2018
Black Helicopters, Caitlin R. Kiernan, Tor.com Publishing, May 2018 
The Million, Karl Schroeder, Tor.com Publishing, 2018
Permafrost, Alastair Reynolds, Tor.com Publishing, 2019 
Perihelion Summer, Greg Egan, Tor.com Publishing, 2019 
The Gurhka and the Lord of Tuesday, Saad Z. Hossein, Tor.com Publishing, August 2019 
The Menace from Farside, Ian McDonald, Tor.com Publishing, August 2019 
Prosper's Demons, K.J. Parker, Tor.com Publishing, 2020 
Anthropocene Rag, Alex Irvine, Tor.com Publishing, April 2020 
The Order of Pure Moon Reflected in Water, Zen Cho, Tor.com Publishing, 2020 
The Tindalos Asset, Caitlin R. Kiernan, Tor.com Publishing, 2020 
Fireheart Tiger, Aliette de Bodard, Tordotcom Publishing, February 2021
The Album of Doctor Moreau, Daryl Gregory, Tordotcom Publishing, May 2021
Inside Man, K J Parker, Tordotcom Publishing, May 2021
The Past is Red, Catherynne M. Valente, Tordotcom Publishing, July 2021
In the Watchful City, S. Qiouyi Lu, 2021, Tordotcom Publishing, August 2021
Comfort Me With Apples, Catherynne M. Valente, Tordotcom Publishing, October 2021
A Spindle Splintered, Alix E. Harrow, Tordotcom Publishing, October 2021
Kundo Wakes Up, Saad Z. Hossein, Tordotcom Publishing, March 2022
These Prisoning Hills, Christopher Rowe, Tordotcom Publishing, 2022
January Fifteenth, Rachel Swirsky, Tordotcom Publishing, Spring  2022
A Mirror Mended, Alix E. Harrow, Tordotcom Publishing, 2022 eb/hc

Eclipse Online 

From October 2012 till March 2013 Strahan edited an online extension of his Eclipse anthology series. *Eclipse Online* featured the following stories:

"Holmes Sherlock: A Hwarhath Mystery", Eleanor Arnason
"Firebugs", Nina Kiriki Hoffman
"One Room an Everywhere", K. J. Parker
"The Contrary Gardner", Christopher Rowe
"Invisible Men", Christopher Barzak
"The Memcordist", Lavie Tidhar
"The Amnesia Helmet", F. Brett Cox
"The Advocate", Genevieve Valentine
"On the Arrival of the Paddle-Steamer on the Docks of V—", Peter Ball
"Sanctuary", Susan Palwick
"In Metal, In Bone", An Owomoyela
"Loss, with Chalk Diagrams", E. Lily Yu

Eclipse Online ceased publication when the publisher Night Shade Books was transferred to new ownership.

Infinity Project (linked anthologies)
 Engineering Infinity (Solaris 2010) 
 Edge of Infinity (Solaris 2012)
 Reach for Infinity (Solaris 2014)
 Meeting Infinity (Solaris 2015)
 Bridging Infinity (Solaris 2016)
 Infinity Wars (Solaris 2017)
 Infinity's End (Solaris 2018)

Awards

 Winner, Hugo Award for Best Fancast, 2021
Winner, World Fantasy Award Special Award – Professional, 2009 (2009 Award, presented in 2010)
Winner, Locus Award, Best Anthology, 2008, 2010, and 2013
Winner, Aurealis Award, Best Anthology, 2009, 2010, 2011, 2013, 2018, 2019, and 2020
Winner, Peter McNamara Award, 2005
Nominated. World Fantasy Award, Best Anthology, 2010, 2011, 2013, 2014, and 2021.
Nominated. World Fantasy Award, Special Award - Non-Professional, 2020 (with Gary K. Wolfe)
 Nominated for a Hugo Award for Best Editor Short Form in 2008, 2009, 2010, 2011, 2012, 2013, 2014, 2017, 2018, 2020, and 2021.
 Nominated for a Hugo Award for Best Fancast in 2012, 2013, 2014, 2017, 2018, 2019, 2020, and 2021.

References

External links
Jonathan Strahan's blog
The Coode Street Podcast – "science fiction and fantasy with Gary K. Wolfe and Jonathan Strahan"
 
 
Edge of Infinity review
What Goes Into Creating an Annual "Year's Best" Speculative Fiction Anthology, interview of Strahan, Ellen Datlow, and two other editors, Kirkus Reviews 2015

1964 births
Living people
Science fiction editors
Australian bloggers
Male speculative fiction editors